The 1983 Prague Skate was held November 3–6. Medals were awarded in the disciplines of men's singles, ladies' singles, pair skating and ice dancing. The singles competition was organized without compulsory figures.

Time table:
 Thursday, 3 November 1983 - Compulsory dance
 Friday, 4 November 1983 - Short programs: Men, ladies and pairs; OSP ice dancing
 Saturday, 5 November 1983 - Free programs: Men, ladies and pairs; free dance
 Sunday, 6 November 1983 - Exhibition

Men

Ladies

Pairs

Ice dancing

References

Prague Skate
Prague Skate